"Losing You" is a song by New Zealand singer and songwriter Sharon O'Neill. The song was released in March 1983 as the lead single from her fourth studio album, Foreign Affairs (1983). O'Neill performed the song live on the Countdown on 6 March 1983. The song peaked at number 26 in Australia in June 1983.

Track listing 
7" (BA 223029) 
Side A "Losing You" 
Side B "Don't Let Yourself Drown"

Charts

References 

1983 songs
1983 singles
Sharon O'Neill songs
Songs written by Sharon O'Neill
Rock ballads
CBS Records singles